Eupithecia hemileuca is a moth in the  family Geometridae. It is found in India (Punjab) and Thailand.

References

Moths described in 1895
hemileuca
Moths of Asia